Bruno Le Maire (born 15 April 1969) is a French politician and former diplomat who has served as Minister of the Economy and Finance since 2017 under President Emmanuel Macron. A former member of The Republicans (LR), which he left in 2017 to join La République En Marche! (LREM), he was Secretary of State for European Affairs from 2008 to 2009 and Minister of Food, Agriculture and Fishing from 2009 to 2012 under President Nicolas Sarkozy. Le Maire is also a noted writer, with his book Des hommes d'Etat winning the 2008 Edgar Faure Prize.

Early life and education
Bruno Le Maire was born on 15 April 1969 in Neuilly-sur-Seine. He is the son of Maurice Le Maire, an executive at the oil company Total, and Viviane Fradin de Belâbre, a headmistress of private Catholic schools, mainly Lycée Saint-Louis-de-Gonzague. Le Maire was educated at Lycée Saint-Louis-de-Gonzague until he obtained his baccalauréat.

Le Maire began attending the École normale supérieure in 1989, and then Paris-Sorbonne University, where he studied French literature. He graduated from Sciences Po in 1995, and was accepted into the École nationale d'administration (ÉNA) in 1996.

Bruno Le Maire is married to painter Pauline Doussau de Bazignan, who is the mother of his four sons. His wife was employed as his parliamentary assistant from 2007 to 2013.

Le Maire is fluent in French, English, Italian and German.

Career

Early beginnings
After leaving the ÉNA in 1998, Bruno Le Maire found a job in the Ministry of Foreign Affairs and International Development. He eventually joined the team assisting the Secretary General of the Office of the President, Dominique de Villepin. He went on to a role of Foreign Affairs Advisor in the ministry in 2002, then onto an advisor role in the Interior ministry in 2004.

Following several roles in Government including one working directly with Dominique de Villepin, Le Maire was chosen to be political advisor to the Prime Minister. In July 2006, Le Maire was appointed to the role of being Chief of Staff for the Prime Minister, replacing Pierre Mongin remaining in the role until Villepin's departure from the office of Prime Minister.

From 2007 to 2008, he was a member of the National Assembly of France, representing Eure's 1st constituency. After becoming a political advisor to the UMP, Le Maire was appointed to be Secretary of State in charge of European Affairs, replacing Jean-Pierre Jouyet, in December 2008, serving until 2009.

From 2008, Le Maire served as a political advisor for the Union for a Popular Movement. He also serves as a council member of Evreux.

Minister of Food, Agriculture and Fishing, 2009–2012
In June 2009, Le Maire became the new Minister of Food, Agriculture and Fishing in the government of François Fillon. During his tenure at the Ministry, he created a new framework to modernize French agriculture, food and fishing. He also hosted the G20 Agriculture summit in 2011, which resulted in the creation of AMIS (Agricultural Market Information System). The main objective of AMIS is to monitor the global agricultural market under a rotating presidency. An intervention Forum can be convoked if the presiding country judges it necessary.

Candidacies for leadership roles

In August 2012, Le Maire announced that he would be a candidate for the presidency of the Union for a Popular Movement, competing against former Prime Minister François Fillon, Secretary General Jean-François Copé and former Minister of Ecology Nathalie Kosciusko-Morizet. He decided to develop a reformist line and to focus his campaign around four main axes:

 Enhancing European economic integration 
 Strengthening French entrepreneurship and economy 
 Going back to the values of respect and authority in society 
 Renewing generations in political parties.

He failed however to obtain the necessary number of sponsors. In November 2014, Le Maire obtained 29.8% of votes against Nicolas Sarkozy in the election for the presidency of The Republicans (formerly UMP).

Le Maire was considered a serious challenger of the 2016 centre-right primary as the polls suggested he could be third-placed but got a poor result with 2.4%. He became LR candidate François Fillon’s international affairs spokesman, but resigned when Fillon was embroiled in a financial scandal during his campaign. Le Maire has since distanced himself from his party, calling for the right to work constructively with Macron to ensure the president's five years in office succeeds and prevents the far-right National Front making further electoral inroads.

On 17 May 2017, The Republicans Secretary-General Bernard Accoyer issued a statement that anyone from the party that was a member of the government was no longer a member, including Le Maire.

Minister of the Economy and Finance, 2017–present

In May 2017, Le Maire was appointed by President Emmanuel Macron Minister of the Economy in the first Philippe government. In this capacity, he is supported by Budget Minister Gerald Darmanin. Shortly after being appointed as the Minister of the Economy, Le Maire became a member of La République En Marche! following conflicting reports that he was excluded from The Republicans party. Le Maire was able to win reelection in his constituency after beating National Front candidate, Fabienne Delacour. He was appointed Minister of the Economy and Finance in the second Philippe government on 19 June 2017.

By November 2017, Le Maire was reported to explore his options to succeed Jeroen Dijsselbloem as the next President of the Eurogroup; the role of which was eventually given to Mário Centeno of Portugal. In 2019, he led the European Union's selection process for a European candidate to succeed Christine Lagarde as managing director of the International Monetary Fund.

On 5 June 2022, Le Maire said that France negotiated with the United Arab Emirates to replace some oil imports from Russia.

Other activities

European Union organisations
 European Investment Bank (EIB), ex officio member of the Board of Governors
 European Stability Mechanism (ESM), member of the Board of Governors

International organisations
 Asian Development Bank (ADB), ex officio member of the Board of Governors
 Asian Infrastructure Investment Bank (AIIB), ex officio member of the Board of Governors
 European Bank for Reconstruction and Development (EBRD), ex officio member of the Board of Governors
 Inter-American Investment Corporation (IIC), ex officio member of the Board of Governors
 International Monetary Fund (IMF), ex officio member of the Board of Governors
 Joint World Bank-IMF Development Committee, Member
 Multilateral Investment Guarantee Agency (MIGA), World Bank Group, ex officio member of the Board of Governors
 World Bank, ex officio member of the Board of Governors

Non-profit organisations
 European Council on Foreign Relations (ECFR), member
 Hertie School of Governance, member of the Board of Trustees
 Long-Term Investors Club, member 
 Permanent Platform of Atomium Culture, member of the Advisory Board

Political positions

Domestic policy
During the conservative primaries in 2016, Le Maire shifted to the right, taking a tough stance on law and order and national identity issues. He called for the immediate expulsion of foreigners regarded as suspect by the security services, the deportation of foreign nationals who complete jail terms, and a curb of refugee numbers.

Economic policy

Le Maire has set out a free-market economic agenda, calling for the privatisation of France's labour offices, the end of subsidised jobs and capping of welfare benefits. Since taking office, he has steered Macron's drive to lighten the government touch on the economy and cut red-tape, and is overseeing a push to privatize airports and other state-controlled companies.

In 2016, however, Le Maire was quoted as saying the prospect of Britain leaving the European Union was a "fabulous opportunity for France" as it would remove the bloc's main champion of deregulation. He vowed on 9 July 2017 to put forward a plan to protect French companies from foreign takeovers.

On foreign trade, Le Maire expressed his opposition against the Transatlantic Trade and Investment Partnership (TTIP) and also argued for a more protectionist trade policy in order to better defend against "dumping" by China.

In August 2017, Le Maire called upon EU nations to step up efforts to address how they tax the digital economy and stated that a "new momentum" was needed to get a fairer contribution from digital platforms, after a report that Airbnb paid less than €100,000 of taxes in France in 2016. He categorised low tax payments as "unacceptable".

Amid the COVID-19 pandemic, Le Maire and his German counterpart Olaf Scholz were credited as instrumental in overcoming Dutch and Italian resistance and securing the EU's 500 billion euros emergency deal to provide financial aid to workers, companies and governments struggling as a result of the virus.

In July 2020, Le Marie announced that the French government will cut taxes French companies have to pay in addition to normal corporate income tax by 20 million euros over the course of next two years.

Brexit
On Brexit itself, Le Maire caused controversy on 20 July 2017 when he told the French Parliament's economic affairs committee: "The United Kingdom has a remaining balance to pay to the EU budget of €100 billion" The view held by Le Maire has been shared by European Leaders since April 2017 with some of them believing the "divorce-bill" will lead the UK to owing the European Union £50 billion He also promised to set up a special court to handle English-law cases for financial contracts after Brexit during a conference in New York.
 
Speaking to the BBC in January 2019, Le Maire said the Brexit withdrawal agreement could not be renegotiated and it was up to the UK to find way through the impasse. He also said a no-deal Brexit would be "catastrophic" for the UK.

Foreign policy
On foreign policy, Le Maire is a traditional Gaullist, favouring French national independence. He has argued for a reinforced European defense policy to secure the bloc's exterior borders and fight terrorism, with more spending on the military by Germany in particular.

In February 2019, Le Maire criticized Germany’s ban on arms sales to Saudi Arabia. Le Maire said: "It is useless to produce weapons through improved cooperation between France and Germany if we are unable to export them." Germany imposed the ban after the assassination of Saudi journalist Jamal Khashoggi and over human rights concerns about the Saudi Arabian–led intervention in Yemen.

On 1 March 2022, Le Maire warned that the EU "will bring about the collapse" of the Russian economy. He said France rejected Russia's demand that foreign buyers must pay in rubles for Russian gas from 1 April, adding that "we are preparing" for a "situation tomorrow in which ... there is no longer any Russian gas."

Controversy
In 2019, Le Maire received several letters containing death threats, including one with bullets enclosed.

In 2021, Reuters reported that Le Maire’s phone was investigated to determine whether it had been infected by a spyware known as Pegasus.

Personal life

Le Maire is married to Pauline Doussau de Bazignan. They have four children. The family has a holiday home in Saint-Pée-sur-Nivelle.

Depiction in film
In the movie La Conquête (The Conquest), about Nicolas Sarkozy's career, he was played by Emmanuel Noblet.

Honours
 : Commander 1st Class of the Order of the Dannebrog (2018)
 : Commander of the Ordre du Mérite Maritime (2009)
 : Knight Commander of the Order of Merit of the Federal Republic of Germany (2022)
 : Commander of the National Order of the Lion (2019)

Bibliography
 Le Ministre. Éditions Grasset, 2004
 Des hommes d'Etat. Éditions Grasset, 2007 (2008 Edgar Faure Prize)
Jours de pouvoir, Éditions Gallimard, 2013

References

|-

|-

1969 births
Living people
Lycée Louis-le-Grand alumni
École Normale Supérieure alumni
Sciences Po alumni
École nationale d'administration alumni
Hertie School people
French Ministers of Agriculture
French Ministers of Finance
Deputies of the 13th National Assembly of the French Fifth Republic
Deputies of the 14th National Assembly of the French Fifth Republic
Deputies of the 15th National Assembly of the French Fifth Republic
La République En Marche! politicians
People from Neuilly-sur-Seine
Politicians from Île-de-France
The Republicans (France) politicians
Members of the Borne government
Recipients of orders, decorations, and medals of Senegal